The 1993 season of the 3. divisjon, the fourth highest association football league for men in Norway.

Between 22 and 24 games (depending on group size) were played in 19 groups, with 3 points given for wins and 1 for draws. All group winners were promoted to the 2. divisjon, as well as some of the best runners-up.

Tables 

Group 1
Holter – promoted
Torp
Lisleby
Nes
Kvik Halden
Østsiden
Ull-Kisa
Trøgstad/Båstad
Eidskog
Kjellmyra – relegated
Askim – relegated
Flisa – relegated

Group 2
Sarpsborg – promoted
Rælingen
Nordstrand
Greåker
Rakkestad
Stovnerkameratene
Tune
Kløfta
Hafslund
Borgen – relegated
KFUM Oslo – relegated
Manglerud Star – relegated

Group 3
Aurskog-Finstadbru – promoted
Raufoss
Høland
Gjøvik-Lyn
Skjetten
Nordre Land
Bjørkelangen
Gjelleråsen
Gran
Skreia – relegated
Kapp – relegated
Oppsal – relegated

Group 4
Faaberg – promoted
Lillehammer FK
Ham-Kam 2
Biri
Brumunddal
Sel
Ottestad
Stange
Vang
Lom – relegated
Kvam – relegated
Moelven – relegated

Group 5
Fossum – promoted
Årvoll
Liv/Fossekallen
Drafn
Snøgg
Teie
Urædd
Solberg
Drammens BK – relegated
Tollnes – relegated
Tønsberg FK – relegated
Slagen – relegated

Group 6
Holmen – promoted
Tjølling
Mjøndalen 2 – relegated
Holmestrand
Slemmestad
Steinberg
Skotfoss
Gulset
Bygdø
Asker – relegated
Storm – relegated
ROS – relegated

Group 7
Mandalskameratene – promoted
Kvinesdal
Larvik Turn
Øyestad
Gjekstad & Østerøya
Vigør
Langesund
Vindbjart
Sørfjell
Hei – relegated
Grane – relegated
Greipstad – relegated

Group 8
Hana – promoted
Randaberg
Figgjo
Eiger
Sola
Staal
Varhaug
Nærbø
Vardeneset
Voll – relegated
Sunde – relegated
Bjerkreim – relegated

Group 9
Kopervik – promoted
Åkra
Nord
Skjold
Nest
Solid
Bremnes
Hardy
Trott
Øygard – relegated
Trio – relegated
Avaldsnes – relegated

Group 10
Bjørnar – promoted
Lyngbø
Nymark
Telavåg
Hovding
Radøy
Varegg
Follese
Vadmyra
Voss – relegated
Bergen Nord – relegated
Fyllingen – relegated

Group 11
Florø – promoted
Eikefjord
Stryn
Høyang
Førde
Eid
Tempo
Fjøra
Tornado
Jotun
Sandane – relegated
Vikane – relegated

Group 12
Langevåg – promoted
Skarbøvik
Brattvåg
Sykkylven
Hessa
Åram
Stranda
Stordal
Valder
Skodje
Hareid
Hovdebygda – relegated

Group 13
Clausenengen – promoted
Kristiansund
Molde 2
Bryn
Rival
Tomrefjord
Isfjorden
Moldekameratene
Træff
Batnfjord – relegated
Gossen – relegated
Kvass – relegated

Group 14
Tynset – promoted
NTHI
Fosen
Orkanger
Ørland
Alvdal
Sverresborg
KIL/Hemne
Rissa
Vanvik – relegated
Kvik – relegated
Fevåg – relegated

Group 15
Verdal – promoted
Ranheim
Vinne
Freidig
Vuku
Nationalkameratene
Fram
Henning
Sverre
Utleira – relegated
Skogn – relegated
Sparbu – relegated

Group 16
Mo/Bossmo – promoted
Grand Bodø
Mosjøen
Åga
Olderskog
Saltdalkameratene
Brønnøysund
Sandnesssjøen
Halsakameratene
Sørfold
Korgen – relegated
Meløy – relegated

Group 17
Narvik/Nor – promoted
Kvæfjord
Vågakameratene
Lofoten
Ajaks
Landsås
Morild
Stokmarknes
Andenes
Luna
Beisfjord
Kabelvåg – relegated

Group 18
Silsand – promoted
Finnsnes
Skjervøy
Salangen
Tromsdalen 2
Ramfjord
Ulfstind
Fløya
Kåfjord
Ullsfjord
Kvaløysletta
Ringvassøy
Storsteinnes – relegated

Group 19
Norild – promoted
Bjørnevatn
Nordlys
Lakselv
HIF/Stein
Nordkinn
Bølgen
Indrefjord
Vardø
Kautokeino – relegated
Tverrelvdalen – relegated
Øksfjord – relegated

References

Norwegian Third Division seasons
4
Norway
Norway